Alexandria Parish is one of the 57 parishes of Cumberland County, New South Wales, a cadastral unit for use on land titles. It contains the area to the south and east of Sydney city including Bondi, Paddington and Clovelly. It was probably named after the Battle of Alexandria fought in 1801. The Parish of Alexandria roughly corresponds with the "Eastern Suburbs" in the traditional narrow sense of that term. The "Eastern Suburbs" in a wide sense also includes the suburbs immediately to the south, in the Parish of Botany.

References

Parishes of Cumberland County